Nello Mascia (born 28 December 1946) is an Italian actor. He has appeared in more than forty films since 1971.

Selected filmography

References

External links 

1946 births
Living people
Italian male film actors